De Hef, officially Koningshaven Bridge, is a vertical-lift bridge over the Koningshaven (Kings Harbor) channel at the port of Rotterdam, Netherlands. Built in 1927, the bridge was part of the Breda–Rotterdam railway line until it was decommissioned in 1993. Today, it is a Rijksmonument heritage site.

History 
The predecessor bridge dated from 1878. Its configuration as a swing bridge proved an obstacle to shipping (the most notable incident occurring in 1918, when the bridge was struck by the German vessel Kandelfels), and it was replaced by a lift bridge in 1927. It was the first bridge of this kind in western Europe.

The bridge was the subject of a 1928 film by Joris Ivens, titled De brug.

Redevelopment 
Plans to demolish the railway line and bridge in 1993 were abandoned after widespread protests from local residents. The line was removed but the bridge was left in place as a Rijksmonument national heritage monument.

In November 2014, the disused bridge's  lift span was temporarily removed to permit renovation. It was transported to the Merwehaven port, where it was refurbished in 2016, the work funded by the city of Rotterdam. It was reinstalled in February 2017.

In February 2022, Rotterdam announced that the middle section of the bridge would be temporarily removed again, to allow Jeff Bezos's Y721 superyacht to pass through. In response to criticism of this decision, Rotterdam mayor Ahmed Aboutaleb stated in February of that year that no permit had yet been applied for.  Later reports indicated that plans to temporarily dismantle De Hef have been shelved, leaving it unclear if Y721 will be finished as is, and how it will sail down the river if it remains of the same dimensions.

Gallery

References

Rijksmonuments in Rotterdam
Railway bridges in the Netherlands
Vertical lift bridges
Bridges in Rotterdam